KAOD B.C. (Greek: ΚΑΟΔ K.A.E.) was a professional basketball club that was based in Drama, Greece. The club played from 1989, until 2015, playing several years in the top-tier level Greek Basket League.

Logos

History
The team two of its best seasons so, in the 2000–01 season, when KAOD became the champion of the Greek 2nd Division, and in the next season, 2001–02, when KAOD played in the Greek top-tier level league, the Greek 1st Division. They also won the Greek 2nd Division in the 2010–11 season. After the 2014–15 season, KAOD withdrew from the top-tier level Greek Basket League.

Championships
Greek A2 League:
Champions (2): 2001, 2011

Notable players

  Vangelis Vourtzoumis
  Kostas Charalampidis
  Sakis Karidas
  Kostas Kakaroudis
  Ioannis Athinaiou
  Vladimir Petrović-Stergiou
  Vangelis Margaritis
  Linos Chrysikopoulos
  Alexandros Sigkounas
  Theodoros Zaras
  Guy-Marc Michel
  Edin Bavčić
  Nikola Marković
  Filip Čović
  Dejan Borovnjak
  Andrés Guibert
  Ryan Lorthridge
  Lazeric Jones
  Julian Vaughn
  J'Covan Brown 
  Robert Loe

Head coaches
  Kostas Missas
  Nenad Marković

External links
Official Website 
Eurobasket.com Team Page

Basketball teams in Greece
Drama, Greece
1989 establishments in Greece